Kavango may refer to:

Geographical features
 Okavango River, a river in southwest Africa, which drains into the Okavango Delta
 Okavango Delta, a delta in Botswana
 Okavango Basin, an endorheic basin that includes the Okavango River and Okavango Delta.

Administrative units
 Kavango Region, a region of Namibia until 2013, when it was split into Kavango East and Kavango West
 Kavango East, one of 14 regions of Namibia
 Kavango West, one of 14 regions of Namibia

People and languages
 Kavango people, an ethnic group inhabiting the Kavango region
 Kavango languages, a group of languages that partially overlaps with the Kavango people

Language and nationality disambiguation pages